The CMLL International Gran Prix (1998) was a lucha libre, or professional wrestling, tournament produced and scripted by the Mexican professional wrestling promoter Consejo Mundial de Lucha Libre (CMLL; "World Wrestling Council" in Spanish) which took place on August 14, 1998 in Arena México, Mexico City, CMLL's main venue. The 1998 International Gran Prix was the fifth time CMLL has held an International Gran Prix tournament since 1994. All International Gran Prix tournaments have been a one-night tournament, always as part of CMLL's Friday night CMLL Super Viernes shows.

The fifth International Gran Prix was a one night, 16-man single elimination tournament consisting of Mexican natives and a number of foreign wrestlers, some of which worked for CMLL on a regular basis (such as The Headhunters) and others who were invited specially for the tournament (such as Ricky Santana). The final match saw Rayo de Jalisco Jr. defeat Apolo Dantés to win the International Gran Prix, making Rayo de Jalisco Jr. the first person to win the Gran Prix twice; having previously won it in 1994.

Production

Background
In 1994 the Mexican  professional wrestling promotion Consejo Mundial de Lucha Libre (CMLL) organized their first ever International Gran Prix tournament. The first tournament followed the standard "single elimination" format and featured sixteen wrestlers in total, eight representing Mexico and eight "international" wrestlers. In the end Mexican Rayo de Jalisco Jr. defeated King Haku in the finals to win the tournament. In 1995 CMLL brought the tournament back, creating an annual tournament held every year from 1995 through 1998 and then again in 2002, 2003 and finally from 2005 through 2008.

Storylines
The CMLL Gran Prix show featured four professional wrestling matches where wrestlers were matched up specifically for the tournament instead of as a result of pre-existing scripted feuds. The wrestlers themselves portray either faces (técnicos in Mexico, the "good guy" characters) or heels (referred to as rudos in Mexico, those that portray the "bad guys") as they perform for the fans before, during and after the matches.

Tournament

Tournament overview

Tournament brackets

Tournament show

References

1998 in professional wrestling
CMLL International Gran Prix